Kurt Schottenheimer (born October 1, 1949) is an American former football coach who was a position coach and coordinator at the college and professional levels for almost 40 years.  During his National Football League (NFL) career, Schottenheimer coached with the Cleveland Browns, Kansas City Chiefs, San Francisco 49ers, Washington Redskins and Detroit Lions, and finished as the head coach for the Virginia Destroyers of the United Football League.

College
Schottenheimer was a junior college All-American quarterback at Coffeyville Community College, and led the nation in passing as a sophomore. The following year, he transferred to the University of Miami, where he started for his remaining two seasons at defensive back. Schottenheimer was inducted into Coffeyville's athletic Hall of Fame in 2000.

Coaching career

Collegiate coaching
Schottenheimer then pursued a coaching career in the college ranks, working as the defensive coordinator for William Paterson University in 1974, the linebackers and defensive backs coach at Michigan State from 1978 to 1982, at Tulane as the defensive backs coach in 1983, then as a linebackers coach for LSU from 1984 to 1985 and with Notre Dame in 1986.

Professional coaching
Schottenheimer's successful work at the college level interested NFL teams, and he was hired by the Cleveland Browns in 1987, to be their special teams coordinator. He then accepted the same position with the Kansas City Chiefs in 1989, and remained there until 1994. Following his productive run leading the Chiefs special teams, he went on to coach Kansas City's defensive backs from 1995 to 1998, before being promoted to defensive coordinator in 1999.

Schottenheimer spent three more seasons as a defensive coordinator in the NFL, serving one year with the Washington Redskins (2001) and two seasons with the Detroit Lions (2002–2003). He then served as the secondary coach in Green Bay from 2006 until 2008. It marked Schottenheimer's second stint with the Packers, having coached defensive backs for the team in 2004, before spending one year as the secondary coach for the St. Louis Rams (2005).

Schottenheimer was hired by Head Coach Mike Singletary to be the San Francisco 49ers' special teams coordinator for the 2010 season. He was dismissed at the conclusion of the season following the team's firing of Singletary.  After this, he joined his older brother, Marty Schottenheimer at the new Virginia Destroyers franchise of the United Football League.

In September 2012, just prior to the start of the 2012 UFL season, Schottenheimer was named as his brother's successor as head coach of the Destroyers. However, the league suspended operations during the season, and the Destroyers ended the shortened season with a 1–3 record.

Head coaching record

Personal life
Schottenheimer is a graduate of Fort Cherry High School.  He and his wife, the former Colleen Duffey, have two daughters, Steele and Sloane. His older brother Marty was head coach for four NFL teams, most notably the Kansas City Chiefs, and was his predecessor as head coach of the Virginia Destroyers of the United Football League, where Kurt previously served as a volunteer defensive assistant; Marty died in 2021. His nephew, Brian Schottenheimer, is currently a coaching analyst for the Dallas Cowboys.

References

1949 births
Living people
American football defensive backs
American football quarterbacks
Cleveland Browns coaches
Coffeyville Red Ravens football players
Detroit Lions coaches
Green Bay Packers coaches
LSU Tigers football coaches
Miami Hurricanes football players
Michigan State Spartans football coaches
Notre Dame Fighting Irish football coaches
United Football League (2009–2012) head coaches
Virginia Destroyers coaches
William Paterson Pioneers football coaches
Washington Redskins coaches
National Football League defensive coordinators
People from McDonald, Pennsylvania
Players of American football from Pennsylvania